Geleia is a genus of karyorelict ciliates in the family Geleiidae.

The genus name is a taxonomic patronym honoring the Hungarian protistologist József von Gelei (1885-1952).

Systematics 
17 species are currently described in the genus Geleia.
 Geleia acuta Dragesco, 1960
 Geleia decolor Kahl, 1933
 Geleia filiformes Nouzarède, 1976
 Geleia fossata Kahl, 1933 is the type species of the genus.
 Geleia heterotricha Dragesco, 1960, redescribed as Gellertia heterotricha Dragesco, 1999
 Geleia hyalina Dragesco, 1960
 Geleia luci Dragesco, 1960
 Geleia major Dragesco, 1954
 Geleia martinicense Nouzarède, 1976
 Geleia murmanica Raikov, 1962
 Geleia nigriceps Kahl, 1933
 Geleia obliqua Dragesco, 1960
 Geleia orbis Fauré-Fremiet, 1951
 Geleia simplex Fauré-Fremiet, 1951
 Geleia swedmarki Dragesco
 Geleia tenuis Dragesco, 1954
 Geleia vacuolata Dragesco, 1960

Phylogeny 
Comparison and phylogenetic analysis of 18S rRNA sequences showed that Geleia is the sister group to a clade grouping Parduczia orbis with Corlissina maricaensis.

References 

Ciliate genera
Karyorelictea
Taxa described in 1933